The 2019 FIFA Beach Soccer World Cup was an international beach soccer tournament held in Paraguay from 21 November to 1 December 2019. The 16 national teams involved in the tournament were required by FIFA to register a squad of 12 players, including two goalkeepers. Only players in these squads were eligible to take part in the tournament which was revealed on 15 November 2019.

This article lists the national beach soccer squads that took part in the tournament. The age listed for each player is as on 21 November 2019, the first day of the tournament and the names of the players shown are that of the FIFA Display Names listed on the official squad document issued by FIFA.

Group A

Paraguay
Coach:  Gustavo Zloccowick

The final squad was announced on 12 November 2019.

Japan
Coach: Ruy Ramos

The final squad was announced on 11 November 2019.

Switzerland
Coach: Angelo Schirinzi

The final squad was announced on 13 November 2019.

United States
Coach: Eddie Soto

The final squad was announced on 8 November 2019.

Group B

Uruguay
Coach: Miguel Zabala

The final squad was announced on 11 November 2019.

Mexico
Coach: Ramón Raya

The final squad was announced on 15 November 2019.

Italy
Coach: Emiliano del Duca

The final squad was announced on 12 November 2019.

Tahiti
Coach: Naea Bennett

The final squad was announced on 15 November 2019.

Group C

Belarus
Coach:  Nicolás Caporale

United Arab Emirates
Coach: Mohamed Bashir

The final squad was announced on 11 November 2019.

Senegal
Coach: Oumar Sylla

Russia
Coach: Mikhail Likhachev

The final squad was announced on 14 November 2019.

Group D

Brazil
Coach: Gilberto Costa

The final squad was announced on 13 November 2019.

Oman
Coach: Talib Al-Thanawi

The preliminary squad was announced on 3 November 2019.

Portugal
Coach: Mário Narciso

The final squad was announced on 13 November 2019.

Nigeria
Coach: Audu Adamu

The final squad was announced on 6 November 2019.

Statistics
Overall, 192 players have travelled to Paraguay to compete in the tournament.

Fourteen of the sixteen managers are managing their own nation's national team whilst two manage foreign teams in respect to their own nationality.

Youngest v Oldest

Average age of squads

Players by age category

References

External links
FIFA Beach Soccer World Cup, FIFA.com

Squads
Beach soccer tournament squads